The Hercegovačka Gračanica Monastery is a Serbian Orthodox monastery located in Trebinje, in Bosnia and Herzegovina.

Largely a copy of the Gračanica monastery in Kosovo, it was completed in 2000. The monastery is located above the city, on the historic Crkvina Hill, and is dedicated to the Virgin Mary.

References

Buildings and structures in Trebinje
Serbian Orthodox monasteries in Bosnia and Herzegovina